Monodendri (Greek: Μονοδένδρι) is a suburban village located 10 km south of Patras, Greece. It is part of the municipal unit of Vrachnaiika. It is situated on the Gulf of Patras coast, adjacent to Roitika to the north, and Vrachnaiika to the southwest. The community has a disused train station on the line form Patras to Pyrgos. Its population is around 700. The Greek National Road 9 (Patras - Pyrgos) passes east of the village.

Historical population

See also
List of settlements in Achaea

References

Vrachnaiika
Populated places in Achaea